The women's javelin throw at the 2014 IPC Athletics European Championships was held at the Swansea University Stadium from 18–23 August.

Medalists

See also
List of IPC world records in athletics

References

Javelin Throw
2014 in women's athletics
Javelin throw at the World Para Athletics European Championships